Sarah Stefanie Hecken (born 27 August 1993) is a German retired figure skater. She is a four-time German national champion (2008, 2010, 2011 and 2013) and has won twelve senior international medals, including six gold. She has placed as high as 11th at the World Championships. Her first international victory was at the 2007 Junior Grand Prix event in Germany.

Personal life
Sarah Stefanie Hecken was born in Mannheim.

Career

Early years
Hecken got her first skates when she was only 18 months old. Her first moves on skates were done during summer training in Kaiserslautern. Peter Sczypa became her coach in 1997. At the age of five, she landed her first single axel and at 9 years old, she landed her first double Axel and triple jump (toe loop).

At the age of 10, she skated at the German Novice Championships, which was held as an open competition, where she won the silver medal. Due to her young age, she skated at the Novice Competition again one year later at 11, where she won her first national title.

In the 2005–2006 season, Hecken skated in the youth category and won her second national title. During that season, she skated her first senior competition, the Baden-Württembergische Championship, and won that regional title at the senior level.

2006–2007 was her first national junior year, but she was still too young for international junior competitions. She won her third national title at the German Championships in the junior category. Again, she won the Baden-Württembergische Championship in the senior class.

2007–2008 season
After placing 13th at the Junior Grand Prix in Vienna, Austria, Hecken rebounded by winning the Junior Grand Prix in Chemnitz, Germany, becoming the first ever German lady to win a Junior Grand Prix event. At that event she landed her 3Toe-3Toe Combination for the first time.

After winning the first and second German Junior Worlds qualifier and the Eisemann Trophy in Stuttgart, Germany, Hecken went on to take her fourth consecutive national title by winning the senior competition at the German Figure Skating Championships in Dresden, becoming the youngest German lady to ever win that title.

Hecken defended her regional title at the Baden-Württembergische Champion for the third time.
She also won the senior competition of the 2008 Bavarian Open before heading of to the 2008 World Junior Championships in Sofia, Bulgaria where she placed 8th.

2008–2009 season
Hecken began the 2008–2009 season at the Junior Grand Prix in Merano Italy, where she placed third. Her next competitions were the Nebelhorn Trophy in Oberstdorf, Germany and third the Junior Grand Prix in Cape Town, South Africa where she placed 9th and 5th respectively. Hecken claimed her first senior ISU medal at the 2008 Ondrej Nepela Memorial in Bratislava, Slovakia where she placed 3rd.

After placing fourth at the German Championships in Oberstdorf, Germany she returned to Oberstdorf in January 2009 to win the German Junior Worlds qualifier held there as part of the Bavarian Open only days after defending her regional championships title.

Hecken ended the season on a high note by placing 7th at the World Junior Championships in Sofia and winning both the 2009 DEU Pokal in Dortmund, Germany and the 2009 Triglav Trophy

2009–2010 season
The first competition of Hecken's Olympic season was the Nebelhorn Trophy in Oberstdorf, Germany. She placed 7th overall and with a score of 130.73 point she met the German Olympic qualifying criteria for the first time. At her second competition, the Coupe Internationale de Nice, Hecken noticed during the warm-up that her skates didn't feel right and after inspection she noticed that the blade was broken and withdrew from the event.

Hecken was invited to her first two Grand Prix events of her career. At Skate America she placed 8th and scored 131.10. With that score she met the qualifying criteria for the Olympics for the second time. At Skate Canada she placed 9th. On 17 December 2009, one day before the short program at the German Championship, she was officially nominated for the Olympic Games by the German Olympic Sport Confederation. As she was the only lady who met the criteria for the Olympic Games, her berth to the European Championships was confirmed before the German Championship. Hecken won the German Championships by more than 20 points over the second-place finisher. At the 2010 Winter Olympics she was 23rd after the short program with a score of 49.04. In the free skate she scored 94.90 points and ranked 15th. Overall, she placed 18th with a combined score of 143.94 points.

2011–present 
In May 2011, Hecken underwent hand surgery and went to Italy the next month to work with her choreographer Edoardo De Bernardis. In November 2011, she underwent a synovial bursa operation and returned to training in January 2012. She withdrew from the 2012 European Championships because she was not able to skate full programs prior to the championships but competed at the 2012 World Championships in late March.

Hecken competed at the 2012 Skate America. She won her fourth German national title, in Hamburg in December 2012, but lost the direct qualification for the European Championships versus Nathalie Weinzierl.

Programs

Competitive highlights
GP: Grand Prix; CS: Challenger Series (began in the 2014–15 season); JGP: Junior Grand Prix

Detailed results

References

 2009 DEU Pokal
 2008 German Figure Skating Championships
 2008 German Junior Figure Skating Championships
 2007 German Figure Skating Championships
 2007 German Junior Figure Skating Championships
 Open German Junior Figure Skating Championships

External links

 Official site 
 
 Sarah Hecken at The Figure Skating Corner
 Sarah Hecken at Tracings

1993 births
Living people
German female single skaters
Sportspeople from Mannheim
Figure skaters at the 2010 Winter Olympics
Olympic figure skaters of Germany
Competitors at the 2015 Winter Universiade